Africa Day (formerly African Freedom Day and African Liberation Day) is the annual commemoration of the foundation of the Organisation of African Unity on 25 May 1963. It is celebrated in various countries on the African continent, as well as around the world. The organisation was transformed into the African Union on 9 July 2002 in Durban, South Africa, but the holiday continues to be celebrated on 25 May.

Background 
The First Congress of Independent African States was held in Accra, Ghana on 15 April 1958. It was convened by Prime Minister of Ghana Dr. Kwame Nkrumah, and comprised representatives from Egypt (then a constituent part of the United Arab Republic), Ethiopia, Liberia, Libya, Morocco, Sudan, Tunisia, the Union of the Peoples of Cameroon and of the host country Ghana. The Union of South Africa was not invited. The conference showcased progress of liberation movements on the African continent in addition to symbolising the determination of the people of Africa to free themselves from foreign domination and exploitation. Although the Pan-African Congress had been working towards similar goals since its foundation in 1900, this was the first time such a meeting had taken place on African soil.

The Conference called for the founding of an African Freedom Day, a day to "...mark each year the onward progress of the liberation movement, and to symbolise the determination of the people of Africa to free themselves from foreign domination and exploitation."

The conference was notable in that it laid the basis for the subsequent meetings of African heads of state and government during the Casablanca Group and the Monrovia Group era, until the formation of the Organisation of African Unity (OAU) in 1963.

History 
Five years later, on 25 May 1963, representatives of thirty African nations met in Addis Ababa, Ethiopia, hosted by Emperor Haile Selassie. By then more than two-thirds of the continent had achieved independence, mostly from imperial European states. At this meeting, the Organisation of African Unity was founded, with the initial aim to encourage the decolonisation of Angola, Mozambique, South Africa and Southern Rhodesia. The organisation pledged to support the work conducted by freedom fighters, and remove military access to colonial nations. A charter was set out which sought to improve the living standards across member states. Selassie exclaimed, "May this convention of union last 1,000 years."

The charter was signed by all attendees on 26 May, with the exception of Morocco. At that meeting, Africa Freedom Day was renamed Africa Liberation Day. In 2002, the OAU was replaced by the African Union. However, the renamed celebration of Africa Day continued to be celebrated on 25 May in respect to the formation of the OAU.

Contemporary celebrations 
Africa Day continues to be celebrated both in Africa and around the world, mostly on 25 May (although in some cases these periods of celebrations can be stretched out over a period of days or weeks). Themes are set for each year's Africa Day, with 2015's being the "Year of Women's Empowerment and Development towards Africa's Agenda 2063". At an event in New York City in 2015, Deputy Secretary-General of the United Nations, Jan Eliasson, delivered a message from Secretary-General Ban Ki-moon in which he said, "Let us... intensify our efforts to provide Africa's women with better access to education, work and healthcare and, by doing so, accelerate Africa's transformation".

See also 
International Day of the African Child

Footnotes

Notes

References

Further reading 
 Allardt, Helmut ; European Economic Community (1959). The tasks and the aims of the European Economic Community in Africa : lecture given on the occasion of Africa Day at the German Industries Fair, Hanover, 30 April 1959. Brussels : Publications Dept. of the European Communities. .
 Mugabe, Robert Gabriel ; Zimbabwe. Ministry of Information, Posts and Telecommunications (1987). Address delivered to the Nation by Cde R.G. Mugabe, the Prime Minister of Zimbabwe, on Africa Day May 25, 1987. Policy statement. Causeway, Zimbabwe : Ministry of Information, Posts and Telecommunications. .
 Ginkel, J. A. van ; Court, Julius ; Langenhove, Luk van ; United Nations University ; Africa Day Symposium on Integrating Africa (2003). Integrating Africa : perspectives on regional integration and development. Tokyo : United Nations University. .
 Bond, Patrick (2004). South Africa and global apartheid : continental and international policies and politics : address to the Nordiska Afrikainstitutet Nordic Africa Days, Uppsala, Sweden 4 October 2003. Discussion paper / Nordiska Afrikainstitutet = Scandinavian Institute of African Studies. Nordiska Afrikainstitutet. Discussion Paper,  ; 25.

External links 

 Africa Day (African Union website)
 

Symbols of the African Union
Festivals in Africa
International organization days
May observances
1958 establishments in Africa